Nahal Taninim or Tanninim or Wadi az-Zarka is a river in Israel near the Arab town Jisr az-Zarqa, originating near Ramot Menashe and emptying into the Mediterranean Sea south of Ma'agan Michael. It marks the southern limit of the Hof HaCarmel, or Carmel Coastal Plain region.

Etymology
The river is named for the Nile crocodiles that inhabited the nearby Kebara swamps until the early 20th century. The last crocodile was hunted in 1912 and is part of a German taxidermic collection currently on display at the natural history museum of the Tel Aviv University.

The remains of Krokodelion polis, Greek for "Crocodiles City", a city established there in the Persian period (5th–4th century BCE), are still visible today.

See also the mythological monster Tannin.

History
The name River of Crocodiles dates as far back as the Third Crusade, during which the crocodiles devoured two knights who were bathing in the river.

Hydrology
The area of the basin and its tributaries is about 200 square kilometers, including the Taninim, Ada, Barkan, Alona and Mishmarot streams. Nahal Taninim is the cleanest of Israel's coastal rivers. Three waterways meet in Nahal Taninim: the natural stream, a Roman aqueduct extending from the Zabrin springs to Caesarea, and Mifale Menashe, the waterworks that collect surface runoff water and springwater, routing it into the subterranean water table.

Flora and fauna
The dense undergrowth and reeds along Nahal Taninim are home to many different birds, among them waterside warblers and other songbirds.

See also
Directly related:
Tel Tanninim, a mound at the mouth of the stream holding archaeological remains from various periods
General topics:
Geography of Israel
National parks and nature reserves of Israel
Tourism in Israel
Wildlife of Israel

References

External links

Owning Extinction: Tracing Rhetorical Figurations of the Last Crocodile in Palestine, the history of the last crocodile. By Elizabeth Bentley (USA), 2020. Accessed Feb 2021.

Rivers of Israel
Nature reserves in Israel